Precious Hearts Romances Presents is a 5-day Philippine program broadcast on ABS-CBN. It mainly focuses on adaptations of the best selling paperbacks distributed by company holder Precious Hearts Romances. Its first run was from May 4, 2009, to September 27, 2019. The series returned on its second run, premiering on April 30, 2018, with Araw Gabi, replacing Hanggang Saan. The management decided to reboot the said series after five years, which will be under the RSB Unit. The show ended on September 27, 2019.

Episodes
List of Precious Hearts Romances Presents episodes

See also
List of programs broadcast by ABS-CBN
List of ABS-CBN drama series

References

Philippine teen drama television series
2009 Philippine television series debuts
2013 Philippine television series endings
2018 Philippine television series debuts
2019 Philippine television series endings
ABS-CBN drama series
ABS-CBN original programming
Philippine romance television series
Filipino-language television shows